is a Japanese animator, storyboard artist, and director. He is known for directing anime based on the works of Go Nagai, Ken Ishikawa, Takashi Yanase, and twice, Shotaro Ishinomori.

Works (as director) 
 Shuten Douji (1991) episode 3
 Getter Robo Armageddon (1998) episode 4-13
 Shin Getter Robo vs Neo Getter Robo (2000)
 éX-Driver OAV (2000)
 Cyborg 009 The Cyborg Soldier (2001)
 Lupin III: Operation: Return the Treasure (2003)
 New Getter Robo (2004)
 Transformers: Energon (2004)
 Super Robot Wars Original Generation: The Animation (2005)
 Innocent Venus (2006)
 Kotetsushin Jeeg (2007)
 Soreike! Anpanman: Dadandan to Futago no Hoshi (2009)
 Mazinkaizer SKL (2010)
 Soreike! Anpanman: Ringo Bō Ya To Min'Nano Negai (2014)
 Cyborg 009 VS Devilman (2015)
 Soreike! Anpanman: Nanda and Runda of the Toy Star (2016)
 Lupin III - Goodbye Partner (2019)
 Getter Robo Arc (2021)
 Insect Land (2022)

References

External links

Anime directors
Living people
1957 births